Emisael William Cañate Librada (born December 11, 1971) is a former Major League Baseball left fielder and right-handed batter who played for the Toronto Blue Jays in 1993.  The Blue Jays went on to win the World Series that season.
Cañate was a career .213 hitter (10-for-47) with one home run and three RBI in 38 games.

After the 1993 season, Cañate played at the AA and AAA levels in 1994 and 1995, played one season in the Mexican League and five more seasons in Italy before retiring.

See also
 List of players from Venezuela in Major League Baseball

External links

Willie Cañate at Baseball Almanac
Pura Pelota – Venezuelan League statistics

1971 births
Living people
Cardenales de Lara players
Ceci Negri Parma players
Columbus Indians players
Columbus RedStixx players
Indianapolis Indians players
Kinston Indians players
Knoxville Smokies players
Major League Baseball left fielders
Major League Baseball players from Venezuela
Modena Baseball Club players
Parma Baseball Club players
Pastora de los Llanos players
Potros de Minatitlán players
Sportspeople from Maracaibo
Syracuse Chiefs players
Tiburones de La Guaira players
Toronto Blue Jays players
Venezuelan expatriate baseball players in Canada
Venezuelan expatriate baseball players in Mexico
Venezuelan expatriate baseball players in the United States
Watertown Indians players
Venezuelan expatriate baseball players in Italy